Wilton Frederick "Freddy" Weller (born September 9, 1947) is an American country music artist. He recorded for Columbia Records between 1969 and 1980. He had his highest charted single in 1969 with his debut release, "Games People Play".

Musical career
He was born in Atlanta, Georgia, United States. Weller played in a high school group, The Believers, which also contained Joe South. One of his first recording sessions was playing guitar on Billy Joe Royal's 1965 track, "Down in the Boondocks", which was written by South.

His recording career continued in 1967, as lead guitarist in the band Paul Revere & The Raiders.  He penned their 1969 hit "We Gotta All Get Together".

Weller recorded many rock and roll and country songs, such as Joe South's "'Games People Play", Chuck Berry's "The Promised Land" and "Too Much Monkey Business", "She Loves Me Right Out Of My Mind", "Indian Lake", and many others. Weller also played guitar backing for both South and Royal.

Weller's biggest solo hit as a country music artist was "Games People Play", which peaked at No. 2 on the Billboard Hot Country Singles chart in 1969; "Promised Land" and "Indian Lake", both 1971, peaked at No. 3. He co-wrote "Dizzy" and "Jam Up and Jelly Tight", which were hits for Tommy Roe in 1969 and 1970.

Discography

Albums

Singles

References

External links
[ Freddy Weller] at Allmusic.com
Freddy Weller

American country guitarists
American male guitarists
American country singer-songwriters
Musicians from Atlanta
1947 births
Living people
Columbia Records artists
Guitarists from Georgia (U.S. state)
20th-century American guitarists
Country musicians from Georgia (U.S. state)
20th-century American male musicians
American male singer-songwriters
Singer-songwriters from Georgia (U.S. state)
Paul Revere & the Raiders members